In astrology, a balsamic Moon is said to occur when the Moon is less than 45 degrees behind the natal Sun.

For example, if a person has a natal Sun positioned at 10 degrees Aquarius then a balsamic Moon will occur when the Moon reaches 25 degrees Sagittarius.  It will stay balsamic as it transits through Capricorn and then Aquarius, until it reaches 10 degrees Aquarius.

The balsamic Moon is said to relate to one's commitment to destiny, so whenever the Moon is placed in this position it is at a very crucial point, and attention should be made to the earthly events that occur during such an astrological configuration. The balsamic moon also is said to relate to healing and rest, since it is the last phase before the New Moon.

See also 
 Moon phases

External links 
 Balsamic Moon - Khaldea
 Balsamic Moon - Carol Barbeau

Technical factors of Western astrology